The 1966 Pennsylvania gubernatorial election was held on November 8. Republican Ray Shafer, the state's incumbent Lieutenant Governor, was elected to the state's highest office after holding off a charge from future governor Milton Shapp.

Primary

Democratic
Milton Shapp, a wealthy and progressive electronics executive, used his own money to score an upset in the Democratic primary over the party establishment's choice, Bob Casey. Casey, who would later win the governorship in 1986, was a more conservative politician who relied on labor and rural support over the urban and suburban base that Shapp courted.

Republican
Lieutenant Governor Ray Shafer was endorsed by the party establishment and cruised to a primary win. His main opponent was the well known Harold Stassen, the liberal and somewhat eccentric former governor of Minnesota who had retired from the presidency of the University of Pennsylvania.

Major candidates

Democratic
 Milton Shapp, CEO of Jerrold Electronics
 Running mate: Leonard Staisey, Pennsylvania State Senator

Republican
 Ray Shafer, Lieutenant Governor
 Running mate: Ray Broderick, attorney
(Walter Alessandroni was killed in a plane crash when it was too late to change the ballot for the primary, and was posthumously chosen for the Republican Lt. Gov. nomination; the party then selected Broderick.)

Campaign
Shapp ran a spirited campaign, in which he tagged himself as a "man against the machine", but the ambivalence of party leaders toward his renegade candidacy may have ultimately led to his defeat; his campaign was also hurt by fierce opposition from the Philadelphia media, over Shapp's personal involvement in attempting to stop the buyout of the Pennsylvania Railroad.

In contrast to Shapp's exuberant campaign, Shafer had difficulty getting his campaign stabilized, particularly after the original nominee for lieutenant governor, Attorney General Walter Alessandroni, was killed in an aviation accident. Shafer ran on a solid record as a liberal Republican, but struggled to escape the reputation that his career was dependent upon Governor Bill Scranton; although he was able to collect the resources that would allow him to compete financially with Shapp due to a solid fundraising prowess, he was forced to spend much of the early portion of the campaign defending his independence. However, the party split within Democratic ranks proved too much for Shapp to overcome, and Shafer won a moderate victory.

The campaign was smeared by charges of discrimination by both candidates. The Jewish Shapp faced anti-Semitic commentary at many of his rallies and accused GOP committees in several counties of attempts to frighten voters by emphasizing hateful, outdated myths about Shapp's religion. In contrast, Shafer asserted that Democrats were attempted to portray him as a racist; in the closing weeks of the campaign, pamphlets were distributed in minority neighborhoods, which alleged that Shafer's home included a restrictive covenant that would stop the sale of his property to any non-Caucasians.

Results

References

1966
Pennsylvania
Gubernatorial